Sawan Ki Ghata is a 1966 Bollywood musical romance produced and directed by Shakti Samanta. It stars Manoj Kumar, Sharmila Tagore, Mumtaz in lead roles, along with Pran, Jeevan, Madan Puri in other important roles. The music was composed by O. P. Nayyar.

Plot
The film starts with a car accident on a hilly region. Due to break fail, a car fall down and driver became dead soon, in that car there was a child and a suitcase full of rupees and jewelleries. Two poor local labour Bansilal and Shamsher sees the whole incident. Shamsher loots the suitcase and wants to kill the child as he wants no other would be aware of the incident, but Bansilal saves the child and starts taking care of the child, he names him Gopal. After some years, Gopal is now a school going boy and fond of his pet horse. He is in friendship relation with Seema, the only daughter of Shamsher, who now calls himself Rana. This angers Rana and he warns Bansilal to send Gopal to another city, which he does. When Gopal becomes adult, he wants to visit his father and goes to the village. After reaching there he doesn't locate anything about his father, but meets with a stranger. Who is he? What he wants?

Cast
 Manoj Kumar as Gopal
 Sharmila Tagore as Seema
 Mumtaz as Saloni
 Pran as Kailash Chaudhary
 Jeevan as Rana Shamsher
 Madan Puri as Limo
 Padma Khanna as Bela
 Jeevankala as Chameli
 Sunder as Rasila Lal
 Sajjan as Bansilal
 S. N. Banerjee as William
 Mridula Rani as Mrs. Tarakeshwar Chaudhary
 Madhumati as Courtesan
 Master Anwar as Young Gopal
 Kaveeta Oberoi Kaul as Young Seema
 Mauji Singh as truck driver
 Mohan Choti as Buddhuram
 Kedarnath Saigal as Inspector
 Kundan as Inspector
 Ratan Gaurang as Guard
 Neelam as Bindu

Music
The songs are composed by O. P. Nayyar and the lyrics are penned by S. H. Bihari. The soundtrack has 8 songs. Playback singers Asha Bhosle, Mohammed Rafi, Usha Mangeshkar and Mahendra Kapoor have lent their voices for the songs of the film. Director Shakti Samanta visited O. P. Nayyar and finalised 12 tunes for Kashmir Ki Kali and he used the remaining tunes for this film.

External links 
 

1966 films
1960s Hindi-language films
Films directed by Shakti Samanta
Films scored by O. P. Nayyar